Ulaanbaatar City is a professional football club from Ulaanbaatar, Mongolia. They currently play in the Mongolian National Premier League, the highest level of football in Mongolia.

History
The club was founded on 19 March 2016 with club owner, the IT Group, purchasing the Mongolia Premier League license of Khangarid City FC which was subsequently dissolved. The IT Group paid 15 million MNT for the license.

Ulaanbaatar City won the Premier League championship for the first time in 2019, making them eligible to enter the AFC Cup for the first time for the 2020 edition. The team snapped Erchim FC's four-year championship streak in the process. However, the continental tournament was cancelled due to the COVID-19 pandemic before Ulaanbaatar City played its first match.

Stadium
Through the 2019 season, Ulaanbaatar City FC shared the MFF Football Centre as a home ground. Ground was broken for the construction of the team's own G-Mobile Arena in late summer of 2017 with an original anticipated completion being in the third quarter of 2018. The stadium will be the fifth venue in the league along with the MFF Centre, Erdenet Stadium, the National Sports Stadium, and Erchim Stadium.

Domestic history
Key

International competition
 Scores and results list Ulaanbaatar City's goal tally first.

Head coach history

References

External links
Official website
Mongolian Football Federation profile

Football clubs in Mongolia
Association football clubs established in 2016
2016 establishments in Mongolia